Hydraulic roughness is the measure of the amount of frictional resistance water experiences when passing over land and channel  features.
One roughness coefficient is Manning's n-value. Manning’s n is used extensively around the world to predict the degree of roughness in channels. Flow velocity is strongly dependent on the resistance to flow. An increase in this n value will cause a decrease in the velocity of water flowing across a surface.

Manning's n 
The value of Manning’s n is affected by many variables. Factors like suspended load, sediment grain size, presence of bedrock or boulders in the stream channel, variations in channel width and depth, and overall sinuosity of the stream channel can all affect Manning’s n value. Biological factors have the greatest overall effect on Manning’s n; bank stabilization by vegetation, height of grass and brush across a floodplain, and stumps and logs creating natural dams are the main observable influences.

Biological Importance 
Recent studies have found a relationship between hydraulic roughness and salmon spawning habitat; “bed-surface grain size is responsive to hydraulic roughness caused by bank irregularities, bars, and wood debris… We find that wood debris plays an important role at our study sites, not only providing hydraulic roughness but also influencing pool spacing, frequency of textural patches, and the amplitude and wavelength of bank and bar topography and their consequent roughness. Channels with progressively greater hydraulic roughness have systematically finer bed surfaces, presumably due to reduced bed shear stress, resulting in lower channel competence and diminished bed load transport capacity, both of which promote textural fining”. Textural fining of stream beds can effect more than just salmon spawning habitats, “bar and wood roughness create a greater variety of textural patches, offering a range of aquatic habitats that may promote biologic diversity or be of use to specific animals at different life stages.”

References

Erosion
Hydraulics
Hydraulic engineering